Blabia longipennis is a species of beetle in the family Cerambycidae. It was described by Galileo and Martins in 2003. It is known from Colombia.

References

Blabia
Beetles described in 2003